Viktor Vasyl'ovych Pasulko (born 1 January 1961) is a Ukrainian football manager and former player. He serves as head coach of FC Okzhetpes.

Club career
Pasulko was born in Ilnitsa, Ukrainian SSR. He played most of his career as a midfielder in various teams in the former USSR. The last ten years of his career he spent in Germany playing for lower division teams.

International career
Pasulko made his debut for Soviet Union on 20 February 1988 in a friendly against Italy. He played at the UEFA Euro 1988, including the final game against Netherlands and scoring a goal in a group match against England.

Managerial career
Pasulko was plucked from amateur football to succeed Alexandru Spiridon as Moldova national football team manager in January 2002.

In July 2014 he was surprisingly named new head coach of Italian Serie D amateurs Orlandina. His experience in Sicily was however short-lived as he was sacked on 22 September 2014 after just collecting three draws in the first three league games.

Honours
 Soviet Top League winner: 1987, 1989
 UEFA Euro 1988 runner-up

References

External links
Profile at RussiaTeam 

1961 births
Living people
Sportspeople from Zakarpattia Oblast
Soviet footballers
Ukrainian footballers
Association football midfielders
Soviet Union international footballers
UEFA Euro 1988 players
Soviet Top League players
2. Bundesliga players
FC Spartak Moscow players
Eintracht Braunschweig players
FC Bukovyna Chernivtsi players
FC Chornomorets Odesa players
FC Hoverla Uzhhorod players
SC Fortuna Köln players
Bonner SC players
Ukrainian football managers
Moldova national football team managers
Khazar Lankaran FK managers
FC Shurtan Guzar managers
FC Atyrau managers
FC Ordabasy managers
ASV Durlach players
FC Okzhetpes managers
Soviet expatriate footballers
Ukrainian expatriate footballers
Ukrainian expatriate football managers
Soviet expatriate sportspeople in Germany
Ukrainian expatriate sportspeople in Germany
Expatriate footballers in Germany
Ukrainian expatriate sportspeople in Moldova
Expatriate football managers in Moldova
Ukrainian expatriate sportspeople in Azerbaijan
Expatriate football managers in Azerbaijan
Ukrainian expatriate sportspeople in Uzbekistan
Expatriate football managers in Uzbekistan
Ukrainian expatriate sportspeople in Kazakhstan
Expatriate football managers in Kazakhstan
Ukrainian expatriate sportspeople in Italy
Expatriate football managers in Italy
Ukrainian expatriate sportspeople in Luxembourg
Expatriate football managers in Luxembourg